Earlham College is a private liberal arts college in Richmond, Indiana. The college was established in 1847 by the Religious Society of Friends (Quakers) and has a strong focus on Quaker values such as integrity, a commitment to peace and social justice, mutual respect, and community decision-making. It offers a Master of Arts in Teaching and has an affiliated graduate seminary, the Earlham School of Religion, which offers three master's degrees: Master of Divinity, Master of Ministry, and Master of Arts in Religion.

History
Earlham was founded in 1847 as the Friends Boarding School, a boarding high school for the religious education of Quaker adolescents. In 1859, Earlham became Earlham College, upon the addition of collegiate academics. At this time, Earlham was the third Quaker college in the United States (Haverford College was first, Guilford College the second), and the second U.S. institution of higher education to be coeducational (Oberlin College was first). Though the college initially admitted only students who belonged to the Religious Society of Friends, Earlham began admitting non-Quakers in 1865. The college was named for Earlham Hall, home of the Gurneys, an important English Quaker family.

Over time, as Quakerism in America became more progressive, Earlham's practices changed with them. The college has still remained faithful to its Quaker roots. 1960 marked the establishment of the Earlham School of Religion, then the only Friends seminary in the world.

In 2017, Earlham appointed Alan C. Price as its first African-American president. Price left the position in July 2018, and in November of that year was appointed director of the John F. Kennedy Presidential Library and Museum in Boston.

Campus
Earlham's  campus lies at the southwestern edge of Richmond, Indiana, a city of 36,812 (2010 census). The main quadrangle of the campus is called "the Heart".  It is bordered by Earlham Hall (with the Runyan Center student union directly behind it), Olvey-Andis Hall, Lilly Library, Carpenter Hall, Landrum Bolling Center, the science buildings (Stanley Hall, Noyes Hall and Dennis Hall), Tyler Hall, Bundy Hall and Barrett Hall. Ninety-four percent of Earlham students live on campus in a variety of settings. 

The campus has eight residence halls (Barrett Hall, Bundy Hall, Earlham Hall, Mills Hall, Hoerner Hall, Olvey-Andis Hall, Warren Hall and Wilson Hall). In addition, it has 15 theme and friendship houses, which border the North and East edges of the campus. U.S. Route 40 runs along the edge of the campus.

 The Joseph Moore Museum is a natural history museum located on campus and run by students and biology department faculty, focusing on Indiana's natural history, but also features fossil mounts of an Allosaurus and a sabre-toothed cat, an Ancient Egyptian mummy. It is open to the public (free of charge) and tours are available upon request. In 2015, the school developed themed ecotours; visitors can register for these outings to the school's properties of natural areas, which are led by biology students for interpretation. The majority of Earlham College's campus is undeveloped forest and meadow, including the undeveloped "back campus" area, which serves as an outdoor classroom. The Biology Department also maintains and manages Wildman Woods, a short drive from the campus. It is also used for field work and class field trips.

The school has embarked on major campus improvement projects which cost a combined $62.3 million. The science complex (Stanley and Noyes Halls) has undergone a complete renovation. Stanley Hall was completed by fall 2013 and received a LEED Silver certification. A new Center for Science and Technology, completed in 2015, obtained a LEED gold rating. Tyler Hall, built with assistance from an Andrew Carnegie grant, fell into a mild state of disrepair over the last several decades. It has been renovated to a LEED Silver standard. Tyler Hall now houses Earlham's Admissions department. A new Fine Arts building, which opened in August 2014, obtained a LEED gold certification. A new baseball stadium was completed (fall 2013). Major renovations to the football field were completed prior to the 2012 season.

There are two institutions located adjacent to the Earlham College undergraduate campus: Earlham School of Religion, a Quaker theological graduate school, and Bethany Theological Seminary, an independent Church of the Brethren institution offering graduate and non-degree programs. Earlham College students can take courses at these institutions (which share facilities with the college).

While Earlham is predominately an undergraduate institution, it also offers a Master of Arts in Teaching degree.

Curriculum and community 

Earlham's most popular undergraduate majors, by 2021 graduates, were:
Business Administration and Management (32)
Biochemistry (17)
Biology/Biological Sciences (17)
Psychology (16)
Peace Studies & Conflict Resolution (11)
Art/Art Studies (11)
Neuroscience (10)
Computer Science (10)
English Language & Literature/Letters (10)

In keeping with Friends' belief in equality, everyone addresses each other at Earlham by his or her first name, without the use of titles such as "doctor" or "professor".

Roughly 70% of Earlham students go on a semester-length off-campus program to such destinations as Mexico, the U.S./ Mexican border, Vienna, Martinique, Northern Ireland, Great Britain, France, Germany, Spain, New Zealand, Japan, and Tanzania. This high rate is possible because a student's financial aid helps to offset the full cost of one semester on any Earlham-approved program. In addition, there are a number of shorter off-campus May terms, with destinations both within the U.S. and abroad (Australia, Galapagos, Senegal, Menorca, and Turkey, as recent examples). Earlham has an exchange program with Waseda University in Japan, which has existed since 1963. In addition, Earlham College offers the SICE program in Morioka, Japan, a program in which about ten students teach English in middle schools in Morioka. Students prepare for these programs by studying Spanish, Japanese, French and Chinese which are offered on campus during the school year. Tibetan, Creole, and Kiswalli have been offered during some of these off campus programs.

In the sciences, Earlham places a large emphasis on integrating research into the undergraduate curriculum. Through Ford/Knight grants, most science faculty have been or are currently involved with students in research. Earlham has good representation in the Butler Undergraduate Research Conference, held each year in the spring. Earlham's biology and chemistry departments have a long history of producing distinguished graduates, such as Warder Clyde Allee, Jim Fowler, Larry E. Overman, Harold Urey, and Wendell Stanley, the latter two of which won the Nobel Prize in Chemistry (in 1934 and 1946, respectively). Students and faculty in Earlham's CS applied groups jointly provide computer infrastructure support for the college.

The choir department organizes regional and national tours every year for its ensembles. In January 2012, the concert choir performed in Indianapolis, the Cathedral Basilica of St. Louis, and Chicago. The choral and instrumental music departments collaborate on a biennial basis, performing works such as Carmina Burana and Michael Tippett's A Child of Our Time. The college has a full gamelan ensemble, which performs concerts in the Spring. Earlham has an entirely student-managed public radio station, WECI 91.5FM. In addition, 6-10 theater performances occur throughout the year on campus through either the academic department, senior projects or the student company.

Earlham has students from 77 countries, the most out of any liberal arts college in the United States. This equates to roughly 200 students, which is the highest total number of international students for any co-educational liberal arts college in the country. This high diversity is due in part to a strong relationship with the United World College network of international boarding high schools. Since 2004, Earlham College has been a part of the Davis United World Scholars program, which offers need-based scholarships for UWC graduates to continue their education at select institutions in the United States. The Davis Cup, which is awarded to the college with the most current students from this program, has been awarded to Earlham several times. The college also draws from all regions of the United States, with students from 42 states. Domestic minorities represent 15% of the student body.

Earlham is orienting some of the curriculum around exploring local and global problems as well as possible solutions.  In 2016, Earlham students won the million dollar Hult Prize for their "Magic Bus" proposal to help with transportation problems in developing urban environments.

Earlham has the United States' only equestrian program which is run entirely by students. Lessons are available for students of the college and community members. The equestrian center is adjacent to the college-owned 11-acre Miller farm which hosts agricultural interns during the school year and summer and "work days" on Saturdays for the rest of the community during the school year. Miller farm also serves as a residence for upper class students.

In keeping with Quaker tradition, Earlham students voluntarily invest many hours of community service into the Richmond community. Students report an average of 23,000 hours of volunteering work every year and Earlham's Bonner program offers financial aid in exchange for volunteering work for students with high financial need.

In 2000–2001, Earlham College rolled out its "free bike" program, purchasing pink bicycles and placing them around campus for first-come, first-served use. Shortly after the rollout, a group of students began gathering on the heart 15 minutes after the library closed to race bicycles in two-person teams. The weekly tradition became known as Little Two.

Earlham College is a member of the Great Lakes Colleges Association.

Athletics
Earlham competes in NCAA Division III and in the Heartland Collegiate Athletic Conference. The women's sports are basketball, cross country, field hockey, golf, indoor track, lacrosse, outdoor track, soccer, and volleyball. The men's sports are baseball, basketball, cross country, golf, indoor track, lacrosse, outdoor track, and soccer.

The football team was organized in 1888 and been playing games since the 1889 season. As one of the earliest college programs, Earlham has competed against larger foes such as Indiana University, Purdue University, the University of Kentucky, Ball State University, and Butler University. Perhaps the Quakers' most notable football game was an exhibition game against Japan's Doshisha University Hamburgers in 1989. After setting an NCAA Division III record of five consecutive winless seasons, Earlham's football program was suspended starting with the 2019 season. In May 2020, the college announced suspension of men's and women's golf and tennis teams.
The baseball team won its first HCAC Conference title in 2017.

NBA coach Del Harris was the head coach at Earlham for 9 years (1965–1974).  He twice led the Quakers to a Top 10 ranking in the NAIA final poll and won a school-record 175 games and three Hoosier Collegiate Conference championships.  He led them to the NAIA National Tournament in 1971 with a record of 24–5.

Earlham was an NAIA member in all sports until 19xx; they won the NAIA Men's Soccer National title in 1963.
In the 2010–11 season, the Earlham College Men's Tennis team became the first squad in Earlham history to qualify for the NCAA Div. III Championships by winning the Heartland Collegiate Athletic Conference Tournament title. Since the 2011 conference championship, the men's tennis team has won the conference title in 2012 and 2013. In February 2013 the men's tennis team earned its first national ranking in NCAA Division III athletics at no. 30, the first Earlham team to do so since 1999 when the men's soccer team was ranked no. 16.

Earlham's club teams include Ultimate Frisbee, Women's and Men's rugby, the Bike Co-Op, Cheerleaders, Earthquakers (Competitive Dance), Equestrian Program, martial arts groups, Men's Volleyball, and Outdoors Club. A $13-million Athletics and Wellness Center opened at the beginning of the Fall 1999 semester. Students are not charged to use the facility, which features an energy center for cardiovascular and strength training, a group fitness studio for aerobics and yoga, Weber Pool (25 meters by six lanes), racquetball courts, tennis courts, a running track, a climbing wall and Schuckman Court (a performance gymnasium with seating for 1,800). In 2007, Earlham opened its new 2,000-seat Darrell Beane Stadium, with a football field and running track.

Wilderness programs
Earlham was one of the first colleges in the country to initiate student and faculty-led wilderness programs, back in 1970. These programs were designed for incoming first-year and transfer students who received credit for them. The program is divided into the Water August Wilderness and the Mountain August Wilderness and lasts for approximately three weeks; the former canoes in Wabakimi Provincial Park in Ontario and the latter hikes in the Uinta Mountains in Utah. Students have taken ice climbing, dog sledding, caving, white water kayaking, rock climbing, trail construction, and canoeing courses for credit. The program in the past has led spring break canoeing trips to Big Bend National Park in southwestern Texas, a semester course to New Zealand and a May Term (a condensed three-week term after the spring semester) instructor training course for its August Wilderness program. Challenge/experiential education courses on the college's own high and low ropes is offered as well as the chance to be certified as a Wilderness First Responders in an intensive spring break course where students must complete mock rescues. In the past, students have also had the opportunity to rappel off the college's three-story science building.

Notable people

 Ione Virginia Hill Cowles
 Eva Feldman
 Michael C. Hall
 Margaret Hamilton
 Mat Johnson
 Simone Leigh
 Dan McCoy
 Esther Biddle Rhoads
 Zitkala-Sa
 Michael Shellenberger
 Ruth Hinshaw Spray
 Peter Suber
 Stuart Wellington

References

Further reading
Hamm, Thomas D. Earlham College: A History, 1847-1997. Bloomington: Indiana University Press, 1997. .
Kashatus, William C. Beyond the Touchlines: A History of Earlham Men's Soccer. Richmond, IN: Earlham College, 2017.

External links
 
 Earlham Athletics website

 
Buildings and structures in Richmond, Indiana
Education in Richmond, Indiana
Private universities and colleges in Indiana
Quaker universities and colleges
1847 establishments in Indiana
Joseph_Moore_Museum